Salhuskvintetten OLKABILAMO was a band from Salhus, Åsane in Bergen, Norway formed in 1950 by Monrad Holm Johnsen.

History
Monrad Holm Johnsen came from Sandviken to Salhus in 1930 and became active in both sports and in the local man's choir.  He started a band for a revue.  This was the beginning of the band, and he wanted to continue. The three women in the band quit, but the rest wanted to continue, and they formed Salhuskvintetten, although they didn't have a name at the beginning, and were called "Cowboygjengen" (Cowboygang) or "Salhus Cowboys".

It took 12 years before they became famous.  In the start they just played on special occasions and in the yearly review in Salhus, but after they played "Singel og Sand" on radio in 1962 they turned into pop stars.  It was Rolf Wesenlund from Norsk A/S Philips who spotted them and helped them get a contract with Philips.  The single "Singel Og Sand" were on "VG-lista" for 27 weeks and sold 30,000 copies.  They decided to call it a day after 23 years, 21 singles and 5 LPs.  After that they have only played on special occasions. In the later years, three of them have died, Birger Martinussen in 1997, Monrad Holm Johnsen in 1998 and Lars Kalvik in 2000.

The band Vinskvetten started as a parody of Salhuskvintetten.

Members

Mondrad Holm Johnsen
Ole Mjelde
Karl Sjursen
Birger Martinussen
Lars Kalvik

Discography

Salhuskvintetten				1968	Philips
Viser fra vest				1969	Philips
Vi kjem att ...				1969	Philips
Vestlandsviser				1971	Philips
Viser ved vegkanten			1971	Philips
Dei beste frå Salhuskvintetten	1977	Philips
20 Beste					2000	Tylden & Co as

References
Article on www.ballade.no
Discography on www.diskografi.no

Norwegian musical groups